La Légende des siècles (English: The Legend of the Ages) is a collection of poems by Victor Hugo, conceived as an immense depiction of the history and evolution of humanity.

Written intermittently between 1855 and 1876 while Hugo worked in exile on numerous other projects, the poems were published in three series in 1859, 1877, and 1883. Bearing witness to the unparalleled poetic talent evident in all Hugo's art, the Légende des Siècles is often considered the only true French epic and, according to Baudelaire's formulation, the only modern epic possible.

The dreaming poet contemplates the "wall of the centuries," indistinct and terrible, on which scenes of the past, present and future are drawn, and along which the whole long procession of humanity can be seen. The poems are depictions of these scenes, fleetingly perceived and interspersed with terrifying visions. Hugo sought neither historical accuracy nor exhaustiveness; rather, he concentrated on obscure figures, usually his own inventions, who incarnated and symbolized their eras. As he proclaims in the preface to the first series, "this is history, eavesdropped upon at the door of legend." The poems, by turns lyrical, epic and satirical, form a view of the human experience, seeking less to summarize than to illustrate the history of humanity, and to bear witness to its long journey from the darkness into the light.

Origin 

La Légende des siècles was not originally conceived as the vast work it was to become. Its beginning, the original seed, was in a vague project entitled Petites Epopées ("Little Epics"), which features in the notes and jottings of Hugo from 1848, and which gives no indication of so vast an ambition.

After Les Châtiments and Les Contemplations, his editor, Hetzel, was perturbed by the submission of La Fin de Satan and Dieu, both of which were nearly complete. Seeing that Hugo was ready to proceed yet further down the metaphysical (or even eschatological) road mapped out by the final Contemplations, Hetzel became anxious at the probability of their failure with the public, and preferred the sound of the Petites Epopées which Hugo had mentioned, feeling they would be more in harmony with the spirit of the times. Even though these "epics" were still no more than sketches, in March 1857 Hetzel wrote to Hugo, rejecting Fin de Satan and Dieu, but accepting with enthusiasm the Petites Epopées.

This new commission was nevertheless transformed by the influence of Hugo's latest ideas and most recent works, created with the same dash and fire and in a sort of magma of inspiration: a mixture of poesy, mysticism and philosophy which is characteristic of Hugo's first decade of exile. This inspiration normally led him to write a large number of poems, more or less brief, which would finally be published as components in projects which were constantly shifting and evolving. In this case Hugo integrated the little epics into his poetical system by casting them as the "human" panel in a triptych of which "God" and "Satan" were the wings, with the implication that they were merely sparse fragments stolen from a greater epic: the whole of human experience itself. On 11 September 1857 Hugo signed a contract with Hetzel, reserving the right to alter the project's title.

Later, Hetzel pronounced himself willing to publish La Fin de Satan and Dieu; but Hugo, perhaps conscious of the difficulties of completing either to his satisfaction, had by that time thrown himself entirely into the new project. He began by taking the French Revolution as the turning point in human history, intending to use a poem entitled La Révolution as a pivot around which La Pitié Suprême or Le Verso de la page would revolve. More titles were written down, but some were discarded or greatly altered, and the section dealing with the 19th century coalesced as L'Océan — La Révolution — le Verso de la page — la Pitié Suprême — Les Pauvres Gens — L'épopée de l'Âne.

Hetzel followed this evolution with alarm, and, fearing that the great philosophical questions would turn these little epics into towering giants, endeavoured to temper Hugo's ardour. After a serious illness in the summer of 1858, Hugo tried to reassure Hetzel by writing in a more straightforwardly narrative vein (e.g. Le Petit Roi de Galice and Zim-Zizimi), and modified his plans—but retained the general ambition, which he declared in a preface. He had hit on the idea of publishing in several instalments, to give himself more time and space within which to work. The title was not decided on until a month after the manuscript's submission. With his gift for phrases, Hugo came up with La Légende des Siècles. Petites Épopées was kept as a subtitle.

First Series 

The first series was published in two volumes on 26 September 1859 (see 1859 in poetry) in Brussels. In exile, Hugo dedicated it to his home country:

Livre, qu'un vent t'emporte
En France, où je suis né !
L'arbre déraciné
Donne sa feuille morte.

The framing of the series is resolutely Biblical: opening with Eve (Le sacre de la femme) and closing on La trompette du , the classical world is largely forgotten (the Roman Empire, for which Hugo had little admiration, is represented only by its decadence). Several poems dating from 1857 to 1858 were set aside for a future continuation.

Contents 
 Préface
 I. D'Ève à Jésus (Le sacre de la femme ; La conscience ; Puissance égale bonté ; Les lions ; Le temple ; Booz endormi ; Dieu invisible au philosophe ; Première rencontre du Christ avec le tombeau)
 II. Décadence de Rome (Au lion d'Androclès)
 III. L'Islam (L'an neuf de l'Hégire ; Mahomet ; Le cèdre)
 IV. Le Cycle Héroïque Chrétien (Le parricide ; Le mariage de Roland ; Aymerillot ; Bivar ; Le jour des rois)
 V. Les Chevaliers Errants (La terre a vu jadis ; Le petit roi de Galice ; Eviradnus)
 VI. Les Trônes d'Orient (Zim-Zizimi ; 1453 ; Sultan Mourad)
 VII. L'Italie — Ratbert
 VIII. Seizième siècle — Renaissance. Paganisme (Le Satyre)
 IX. La Rose de l'Infante
 X. L'Inquisition (Les raisons du Momotombo)
 XI. La Chanson des Aventuriers de la Mer
 XII. Dix-septième siècle, Les Mercenaires (Le régiment du baron Madruce)
 XIII. Maintenant (Après la bataille ; Le crapaud ; Les pauvres gens ; Paroles dans l'épreuve)
 XIV. Vingtième siècle (Pleine mer — Plein ciel)
 XV. Hors des temps (La trompette du )

New Series 
Work on the second series began immediately after the first, but Hugo was soon busy with Les Misérables and with completing La Fin de Satan and Dieu. In 1862, with the publication of Les Misérables, Hugo reviewed his earlier plan and gathered together the poems already written: L'Âne, Les Sept Merveilles du Monde (a recent one), La Révolution, and La Pitié Suprême. Again, he delayed work for the sake of novels (Les travailleurs de la mer and L'Homme Qui Rit). In 1870, a decisive moment came, when Hugo decided to keep La Révolution for the future collection Les Quatre Vents de l'esprit, and to fuse together La Légende, Dieu and La Fin de Satan, according to the following plan: La Fin de Satan, first book — L'Océan — Elciis — La Vision de Dante — Les Religions (from Dieu) — La Pitié Suprême. Current events in the 1870s, however, saw upheavals in Hugo's life, and he was once more greatly involved in politics.

La Nouvelle Série was finally published on 26 February 1877 (see 1877 in poetry), Hugo's sixty-fifth birthday. Most of the contents date from 1859 and 1875–1877, and the events of the 1870s make themselves felt: the Paris Commune, the fall of Napoleon III, and the beginnings of the Third Republic.

The collection closes with the formidable Abîme, a vertiginous dialogue between Man, Earth, Sun, and Stars, playing on the numberless steps leading to an infinity behind which stands God, and placing human beings, with all their pettiness, face to face with the Universe.

Contents 

 La vision d'où est sorti ce livre
 I. La Terre (La terre – hymne)
 II. Suprématie (Supremacy),  poem inspired by the third part of the Kena Upanishad 
 III. Entre géants et dieux (Le géant, aux dieux ; Les temps paniques ; Le titan)
 IV. La ville disparue
 V. Après les dieux, les rois (I : Inscription ; Cassandre ; Les trois cents ; Le détroit de l'Euripe ; La chanson de Sophocle à Salamine ; Les bannis ; Aide offerte à Majorien ; II : L'hydre ; Le romancero du Cid ; Le roi de Perse ; Les deux mendiants ; Montfaucon ; Les reîtres ; Le comte Félibien)
 VI. Entre lions et rois (Quelqu'un met le holà)
 VII. Le Cid exilé
 VIII. Welf, Castellan d'Osbor
 IX. Avertissements et châtiments (Le travail des captifs ; Homo duplex ; Verset du Koran ; L'aigle du casque)
 X. Les Sept merveilles du monde
 XI. L'Epopée du ver
 XII. Le Poëte au ver de terre
 XIII. Clarté d'âmes
 XIV. Les chutes (Fleuves et poëtes)
 XV. Le Cycle pyrénéen (Gaïffer-Jorge, duc d'Aquitaine ; Masferrer ; La paternité)
 XVI. La Comète
 XVII. Changement d'horizon
 XVIII. Le Groupe des Idylles
 XIX. Tout le passé et tout l'avenir
 XX. Un poëte est un monde
 XXI. Le Temps présent (La Vérité, lumière effrayée ; Tout était vision ; Jean Chouan ; Le cimetière d'Eylau ; 1851 — choix entre deux passants ; Écrit en exil ; La colère du bronze ; France et âme ; Dénoncé à celui qui chassa les vendeurs ; Les enterrements civils ; Le prisonnier ; Après les fourches caudines)
 XXII. L'Élégie des fléaux
 XXIII. Les Petits (Guerre civile ; Petit Paul ; Fonction du l'enfant ; Question sociale)
 XXIV. Là-haut
 XXV. Les Montagnes (Désintéressement)
 XXVI. Le Temple
 XXVII. À L'Homme
 XXVIII. Abîme

Last Series 
The New Series had been advertised with the following message: « Le complément de la Légende des siècles sera prochainement publié, à moins que la fin de l'auteur n'arrive avant la fin du livre. » ("The conclusion to the Legend will be published shortly, provided that it is not preceded by the conclusion to the author.")

On 9 June 1883 the fifth and last tome of La Légende des Siècles was published with the subtitle série complémentaire (see 1883 in poetry). Critics who claimed that the "anticlericalism" and "glibness" were evidence of the bitterness of age were mistaken: in fact, Hugo's cerebral edema of June 1878 had already essentially put an end to his work as a writer, and most of the contents dated from long before. It is probable, but not certain, that he had intended to write new poems.

For example, La Vision de Dante (written in 1853) was initially intended for Châtiments, and Les Quatre Jours d'Elciis (written in 1857) was bumped forward from both the First and the New Series, the prologue dating from perhaps 1880. This assemblage of poems with little narrative drive, alternating dark and bright visions, gives the impression of a contemplative and intemporal epilogue, very different from what came before.

Contents 
 Je ne me sentais plus vivant
 I. Les Grandes Lois
 II. Voix basses dans les ténèbres
 III. Je me penchai
 IV. Mansétude des anciens juges
 V. L'Échafaud
 VI. Inferi
 VII. Les quatre jours d'Elciis
 VIII. Les paysans au bord de la mer
 IX. Les esprits
 X. Le Bey outragé
 XI. La chanson des doreurs de proues
 XII. Ténèbres
 XIII. L'Amour
 XIV. Rupture avec ce qui amoindrit
 XV. Les paroles de mon oncle
 XVI. Victorieux ou mort
 XVII. Le cercle des tyrans
 XVIII. Paroles de Géant
 XIX. Quand le Cid
 XX. La vision de Dante
 XXI. Dieu fait les questions
 XXII. Océan
 XXIII. Ô Dieu,  l'œuvre va plus loin que notre rêve

Collected edition 
In September 1883, several months after the appearance of the Last Series, a "complete" edition was issued in which the three series are mixed together and reorganised according to a more or less chronological plan.

No one is entirely sure how close this comes to Hugo's original vision. It is not impossible that Hugo, physically and intellectually enfeebled, and greatly affected by the death of Juliette Drouet, allowed himself to be overly influenced by friends and by the executors of his estate. The rearrangement, which tries to make things easier for the reader by alternating long and short poems, and poems with different moods, has the effect of erasing the internal logic; in particular, the references to current affairs that are found in the New Series are dispersed. Additionally, it introduces bizarreries of chronology: Greek mythology is depicted after Jesus Christ, and El Cid appears before Muhammad. Finally, it often gives the reader the erroneous impression that this final fusion was what Hugo originally intended, as though the original appearance in "series" were a historical accident. Nevertheless, most modern editions adopt this arrangement for the sake of simplicity.

Contents 

 Préface
 La vision d'où est sorti ce livre
 I. La Terre
 II. D'Ève à Jésus (Le sacre de la femme ; La conscience ; Puissance égale bonté ; Les lions ; Le temple ; Booz endormi ; Dieu invisible au philosophe ; Première rencontre du Christ avec le tombeau)
 III. Suprématie
 IV. Entre géants et dieux (Le géant, aux dieux ; Paroles de géant ; Les temps paniques ; Le titan)
 V. La ville disparue
 VI. Après les dieux, les rois (I : Inscription ; Cassandre ; Les trois cents ; Le détroit de l'Euripe ; La chanson de Sophocle à Salamine ; Les bannis ; Aide offerte à Majorien ; II : L'hydre ; Quand le Cid fut entré ; Le romancero du Cid ; Le roi de Perse ; Les deux mendiants ; Montfaucon ; Les reîtres ; Le comte Félibien)
 VII. Entre lions et rois (Quelqu'un met le holà)
 VIII. Décadence de Rome (Au lion d'Androclès)
 IX. L'Islam (L'an neuf de l'Hégire ; Mahomet ; Le cèdre)
 X. Le Cycle Héroïque Chrétien (Le parricide ; Le mariage de Roland ; Aymerillot ; Bivar ; Le jour des rois)
 XI. Le Cid exilé
 XII. Les Sept merveilles du monde
 XIII. L'Epopée du ver
 XIV. Le Poëte au ver de terre
 XV. Les Chevaliers Errants (La terre a vu jadis ; Le petit roi de Galice ; Eviradnus)
 XVI. Les Trônes d'Orient (Zim-Zizimi ; 1453 ; Sultan Mourad ; Le Bey outragé ; La chanson des doreurs de proues)
 XVII. Avertissements et châtiments (Le travail des captifs ; Homo duplex ; Verset du Koran ; L'aigle du casque)
 XVIII. L'Italie – Ratbert
 XIX. Welf, Castellan d'Osbor
 XX. Les quatre jours d'Elciis
 XXI. Le Cycle pyrénéen (Gaïffer-Jorge, duc d'Aquitaine ; Masferrer ; La paternité) ;
 XXII. Seizième siècle — Renaissance Paganisme (Le Satyre)
 XXIII. Je me penchai
 XXIV. Clarté d'âmes
 XXV. Les chutes (Fleuves et poëtes)
 XXVI. La Rose de l'Infante
 XXVII. L'Inquisition (Les raisons du Momotombo)
 XXVIII. La Chanson des Aventuriers de la Mer
 XXIX. Mansétude des anciens juges
 XXX. L'Échafaud
 XXXI. Dix-septième siècle, Les Mercenaires (Le régiment du baron Madruce)
 XXXII. Inferi
 XXXIII. Le cercle des tyrans
 XXXIV. Ténèbres
 XXXV. Là-haut
 XXXVI. Le Groupe des Idylles
 XXXVII. Les paysans au bord de la mer
 XXXVIII. Les esprits
 XXXIX. L'Amour
 XL. Les Montagnes (Désintéressement)
 XLI. Océan
 XLII. À L'Homme
 XLIII. Le Temple
 XLIV. Tout le passé et tout l'avenir
 XLV. Changement d'horizon
 XLVI. La Comète
 XLVII. Un poëte est un monde
 XLVIII. Le retour de l'Empereur
 XLIX. Le Temps présent (La Vérité, lumière effrayée ; Tout était vision ; Jean Chouan ; Après la bataille ; Les paroles de mon oncle ; Le cimetière d'Eylau ; 1851 – choix entre deux passants ; Écrit en exil ; La colère du bronze ; France et âme ; Dénoncé à celui qui chassa les vendeurs ; Les enterrements civils ; Victorieux ou mort ; Le prisonnier ; Après les fourches caudines ; Paroles dans l'épreuve)
 L. L'Élégie des fléaux
 LI. Voix basses dans les ténèbres
 LII. Les pauvres gens ;
 LIII. Le crapaud ;
 LIV. La vision de Dante ;
 LV. Les grandes Lois (+  Je ne me sentais plus vivant ; Dieu fait les questions)
 LVI. Rupture avec ce qui amoindrit • LVII. Les Petits (Guerre civile ; Petit Paul ; Fonction du l'enfant ; Question sociale)
 LVIII. Vingtième siècle (Pleine mer — Plein ciel)
 LIX. Ô Dieu,  l'œuvre va plus loin que notre rêve
 LX. Hors des temps (La trompette du )
 LXI. Abîme

References

External links 

Correspondance de Flaubert, année 1859
Théophile Gautier, Rapport sur les progrès de la poésie, (partie III, sur Victor Hugo)
Baudelaire, L'Art romantique
Leconte de Lisle, Les Poètes contemporains, III

French poems
Poetry by Victor Hugo
1859 poems
1877 poems
1883 poems